Samuel Putnam Bancroft (July 19, 1846 - October 11, 1929), also known as Samuel P. Bancroft, was an American Christian Scientist and an early student of Mary Baker Eddy.

Biography
As a young man Bancroft, who went by Putney, worked as a shoe operative for Bancroft & Purington in Lynn, Massachusetts. The factory was part-owned by his uncle Thomas Frederick Bancroft. In 1870 he became interested in Christian Science after hearing about it from Daniel Spofford, another early student of Mary Baker Eddy's, and he then studied under Eddy herself. His uncle, a deacon of the First Congregational Church, was not supportive of his association with Eddy and once commented "My boy, you will be ruined for life; it is the work of the devil."

For a short period, Bancroft tried unsuccessfully to establish his own practice in Cambridge, Massachusetts during 1874-1875. Bancroft advertised himself as a "Scientific Physician, Gives no Medicine." Bancroft was generally loyal to Eddy, but she had to warn him against idolizing her, telling him not to "make a Dagon of me" referring to the idol in 1 Samuel 5 in the Bible. Bancroft helped Eddy organize the Christian Science Association in 1876 and the Massachusetts Metaphysical College in 1881. He wrote of Eddy, "[she] showed to her early pupils the loving-kindness of a mother, or the faithful devotion of a sister." However, he eventually became inactive in the Christian Science movement.

In 1923, Bancroft wrote and privately published the book Mrs. Eddy as I Knew Her in 1870. The book was never officially endorsed by the church, but is still read by some Christian Scientists today, and is sold independently. There have been some claims that it was suppressed; however, the Mary Baker Eddy Library, which is owned by the church, calls it "one of the most important reminiscences of Eddy's early years as a practitioner and teacher of Christian Science."

Publications
Mrs. Eddy as I Knew Her in 1870 (Boston: Geo. H. Ellis Press, 1923)

References

External links
Samuel Putnam Bancroft. Mary Baker Eddy Papers.

1846 births
1929 deaths
American biographers
American Christian Scientists
Christian Science writers